Ronaldo Camará (born 5 January 2003) is a Portuguese professional footballer who plays as a midfielder for Feirense.

Professional career
On 10 January 2019, Camará signed his first professional contract with Benfica. He made his professional debut with Benfica B in a 2–0 LigaPro win over Cova da Piedade on 16 February 2020.

On 31 January 2022, Italian club Monza announced the signing of Camará for their under-19 squad.

On 31 January 2023, Camará returned to Portugal and signed with Feirense.

International career
Born in Guinea-Bissau, Camará is a youth international for Portugal.

Honours
Benfica
 UEFA Youth League: 2021–22; runner-up: 2019–20

References

External links
 
 
 

2003 births
Living people
Sportspeople from Bissau
Portuguese footballers
Portugal youth international footballers
Bissau-Guinean footballers
Portuguese sportspeople of Bissau-Guinean descent
Bissau-Guinean emigrants to Portugal
Association football midfielders
S.L. Benfica B players
A.C. Monza players
C.D. Feirense players
Liga Portugal 2 players
Portuguese expatriate footballers
Expatriate footballers in Italy
Portuguese expatriate sportspeople in Italy